Coldwater High School is a public high school located in Coldwater, Ohio.  It is part of Coldwater Exempted Village Schools.

Athletics
Athletic teams are known as the Cavaliers. The school competes in the Ohio High School Athletic Association as a member of the Midwest Athletic Conference. They have captured over 100 league championships in various MAC-sanctioned sports since 1973. The Cavaliers have a total of 28 team State Championships in various OHSAA sports. The Coldwater football team is in 2nd place for the most state titles (7) by a public school since the playoff system began in 1972. That is 5 behind fellow MAC member Marion Local who has 12 state football titles.

State Championships 
 Football - 2005, 2007, 2012, 2013, 2014, 2015, 2020
 Baseball - 1983, 1984, 1987, 1990, 1992, 2014, 2019
 Boys Bowling - 2007, 2012, 2015, 2020
 Girls Basketball – 1990, 1992 
 Girls Bowling - 2012, 2013, 2015, 2017, 2021
 Girls Track and Field – 1994, 1995, 1996

State Runners-Up 
 Football - 1998, 2000, 2009, 2010, 2011, 2016, 2021
 Baseball - 1977, 1991, 2004, 2018
 Boys Basketball - 1999
 Boys Bowling - 2016, 2022, 2023
 Girls Bowling - 2014, 2018, 2020
 Girls Softball - 1996
 Girls Volleyball - 2017, 2022

State Team Tournaments 
 Girls Golf - 2021

Notable alumni
Keith Wenning, professional football player in the National Football League (NFL)
Ross Homan, former linebacker for the Ohio State Buckeyes and NFL draftee
Steve Vagedes, former Arena Football League player
Trent Dues, baseball state champion and head baseball coach for Butler High School

External links
 District Website
 Official Website of the Midwest Athletic Conference

Notes and references

High schools in Mercer County, Ohio
Public high schools in Ohio